Posyolok Myasokombinata is a rural locality (a settlement) in Pyatovskoye Rural Settlement, Totemsky  District, Vologda Oblast, Russia. The population was 200 as of 2002.

Geography 
Posyolok Myasokombinata is located 4 km southeast of Totma (the district's administrative centre) by road. Tekstilshchiki is the nearest rural locality.

References 

Rural localities in Tarnogsky District